Burton B. "Burt" Elliott is an American politician who served as a Democratic member of the South Dakota House of Representatives, representing the 2nd district from 2001 to 2008. He served as Minority Whip from 2005-2008.

He served on the Brown County Commission from 2009-2012.

References

External links

Project Vote Smart - Representative Burt B. Elliott (SD) profile
Burt Elliott OurCampaigns

Democratic Party members of the South Dakota House of Representatives
Living people
1947 births
Politicians from Aberdeen, South Dakota